Spy Chasers is a 1955 American comedy film directed by Edward Bernds and starring the comedy team of The Bowery Boys.  The film was released on July 31, 1955 by Allied Artists and is the thirty-eighth film in the series.

Plot
Princess Ann of Truania arrives at Louie's Sweet Shop.  She is the daughter of the exiled king and is looking for Louie, whose brother is a valuable assistance to the king back in Truania.   They request the boys assistance to safeguard a half-coin for them.  The other half will be delivered to them with a message when it is safe for the king to return to his country and regain control.  The king's assistant, Colonel Baxis and Zelda, Ann's lady-in-waiting are traitors and are immediately distrusted by the boys.  The traitor's intend to send a fake half-coin to the boys in order to get the king to return to his country too soon so that he can be arrested.  Ann overhears the plot and is kidnapped.  Eventually the boys rescue Ann and convince the king that his assistant is a traitor.

Cast

The Bowery Boys
Leo Gorcey as Terence Aloysius 'Slip' Mahoney
Huntz Hall as Horace Debussy 'Sach' Jones
David Gorcey as Charles 'Chuck' Anderson (Credited as David Condon)
Bennie Bartlett as Butch Williams

Remaining cast
Bernard Gorcey as Louie Dumbrowski
Leon Askin as Colonel Alex Baxis
Sig Ruman as King Rako of Truania
Veola Vonn as Lady Zelda
Lisa Davis as Princess Ann
Richard Benedict as Boris
Frank Richards as George

Home media
Warner Archives released the film on made-to-order DVD in the United States as part of "The Bowery Boys, Volume Four" on August 26, 2014.

See also
List of American films of 1955

References

External links
 
 
 

1955 films
American black-and-white films
Bowery Boys films
American spy comedy films
Allied Artists films
1950s spy comedy films
1955 comedy films
1950s English-language films
Films directed by Edward Bernds
1950s American films